We Shall Overcome is an album by American politician Bernie Sanders, recorded and released in 1987. The album combined folk music and spoken word, narrated by Sanders. He was the mayor of Burlington, Vermont, at the time of the album's release. The album was remastered and rereleased in 2014 and gained wide exposure during Sanders' 2016 presidential campaign.

Background
In 1987, Burlington-based music producer Todd Lockwood was sipping coffee at Leunig's Bistro when he came up with the idea to approach the city's mayor, Bernie Sanders, to record a musical project at his studio, White Crow Audio. Lockwood wrote a letter to Mayor Sanders and a meeting was arranged at the mayor's office. Lockwood originally imagined the album as an audio portrait of Bernie Sanders, but Sanders saw it as an opportunity to tell a much larger story.

Sanders made a list of ten songs he would be willing to record, five of which made the cut for the album.

Because producer Lockwood found Sanders' musical skills inadequate to sing the folk songs on his own, he instead arranged for Sanders to speak the lyrics accompanied by a chorus of backup singers.

Commercial performance
It is estimated that the 1987 cassette tape sold about 600 to 800 copies, out of 1,000 that were produced. The 2014 reissue has sold about 3,000 copies as of March 2016. The album reportedly landed Sanders at No. 116 on Billboard'''s Top New Artist chart in February 2016.

Sanders signed a record contract in 1987 that would guarantee him royalties for any profits made, but did not receive any at the time due to the album's high production costs. In 2016, Sanders earned $2,521 in royalties for his participation in the recording.

Track listing

Personnel
Credits are taken from liner notes of We Shall Overcome''.

Band
 Andy Shapiro – piano
 Tom Berd – organ
 Don Sidney – electric guitar
 Mark Ransom – electric bass
 Jeff Salisbury – drums

Guest musicians
 Howard Mitchell – background vocals, chorus
 Ginny Peck – background vocals, chorus
 Emily Wadhams – background vocals, chorus
 David Weaver – background vocals, chorus
 Steve Rainville – background vocals
 Chris Bailey – chorus
 Nancy Beaven – chorus
 Marcia Brewster – chorus
 Dexter Brown – chorus
 Kathy Carbone – chorus
 Danny Coane – chorus
 Joanne "Little Joyce" Cooper – chorus
 David Daignault – chorus
 Frank Egan – chorus
 Dana Lavigne – chorus
 Tom Lyon – chorus
 Joe Moore – chorus
 Rick Norcross – chorus
 Michael Oakland – chorus
 Debbie Patton – chorus
 Pamela Polston – chorus
 KK Wilder – chorus

Narrative
 Bernie Sanders

Arrangements
 Don Sidney – musical
 Douglas Jaffe – harmony vocals

Technical personnel
 Chuck Eller – engineering
 Todd Lockwood – engineering, production
 Douglas Jaffe – production
 Adam Ayan – digital mastering
 Gateway Mastering – digital mastering

Artistic personnel
 Glenn Russell – photograph

Release history

See also
 American folk music
 Mayoralty of Bernie Sanders

References

External links

1987 debut albums
Political music albums by American artists
Bernie Sanders albums
Covers albums
Folk albums by American artists
Music of Vermont